Temptation of a Monk is a 1993 Hong Kong period drama film directed by Clara Law based on Pik Wah Lee's novel of the same name. The film had Joan Chen and Hsing-Kuo Wu in the lead roles. The film is about a monk named Jing-yi and his haunting past, and a lady assassin who was sent to kill him. The film was banned in China.

Synopsis
Set in 7th Century China, General Shi Yan-sheng (Hsing-Kuo Wu) was tricked into the brutal murder of the crown prince of the Tang dynasty by General Huo Da (Zhang Fengyi), so that he could take the emperor's thrones. General Shi Yan-sheng was forced to flee away but was determined to revenge General Huo Da for his betrayal. However things didn't happen in favor Shi, and all his loved ones including his mother (Lisa Lu) and his girlfriend Princess Hong-e - Scarlet (Joan Chen)  were brutally murdered by Huo Da. Devastated Shi wandered around various place and ended up in a Buddhist monastery. Shi became a monk and changed his name to Jing-yi. One day he came across a widow named Qing-shou - Violet (Joan Chen) who had striking facial resemblances with his girlfriend. Violet also became a nun in the same monastery. Initially, Jing-yi is disturbed by the presence of Violet but later falls in love with her. It was unknown to Jing-yi that Violet was actually an assassin sent by none other than Huo Da to find him.

Cast
Joan Chen as Princess Hong-e - Scarlet / Qing-shou - Violet
 Hsing-Kuo Wu as General Shi Yan-sheng / Jing-yi
Fengyi Zhang as General Huo Da
 Ming-yang Li as The Abbot
Lisa Lu as Shi's Mother

Reception
Temptation of a Monk was met with mixed to positive reviews. While everyone praised the production designs, costumes and cinematography, the writing and characterization was met with lukewarm response. New York Times said that "For all its beauty, the film has its lethargic moments, and the tangled political intrigue that drives the story is not easy to follow." Stephen Teo of Senses of Cinema said that: "Temptation may be in the title but redemption is the real theme of the picture, and it's a measure of Law's inability to expound on the process of redemption that the film finally falls apart." Meanwhile, some of the reviews called this film as a masterpiece  and some other found the use of silence as a medium of communication as spellbinding. The first part of the film reminded critics of Akira Kurosawa's Kagemusha . Director Clara Law later stated that those portions represented dawn of the chaos the internal conflict, of the protagonist and those scenes should not be considered as part of sensationalism.

Awards and nominations

Won
Mili Award-Cinematographer of the Year for Andrew Lesnie by Australian Cinematographers Society (1995)
 Best New Performer Award by Hong Kong Film Awards (1994) for Hsing-Kuo Wu
  Best Original Score Award by Hong Film Awards (1994) for Tats Lau and Yee-Leung Wai 
  Special Award for Ming-yang Li in Golden Horse Film Festival (1993)
  Golden Horse Award for Best Art Direction to Tim Yip, Zhanjia Yang and Wai-Ming Lee in Golden Horse Film Festival (1993)

Nominated
Hsing-Kuo Wu  for Best Leading Actor in Golden Horse Film Festival (1993)
 Eddie Ling-Ching Fong and Pik Wah Lee for Best Original Screenplay in Golden Horse Film Festival (1993)
Arthur Wong  for Best Cinematography in Golen Horse Film Festival (1993)
Tim Yip and Wai-Ming Lee for Best Makeup & Costume Design in Golden Film Festival (1993)
Siu-Hung Leung for Best Action Choreography in Golden Film Festival (1993)
Best Picture in Hong Kong Film Awards (1994)
Clara Law for Best Director in Hong Kong Film Awards (1994)
Hsing-Kuo Wu for Best Actor in Hong Kong Film Awards (1994)
Ming-yang Li  for Best Supporting Actor in Hong Kong Film Awards (1994)
Andrew Lesnie and Arthur Wong for Best Cinematography in Hong Kong Film Awards (1994)
Tim Yip, Zhanjia Yang and Wai-Ming Lee for Best Art Direction in Hong Kong Film Awards (1994)
Wai-Ming Lee for Best Costume & Make Up Design in Hong Kong Film Awards (1994)
Golden Lion Award in Venice Film Festival (1993)

Trivia
 Joan Chen shaved her head for the role of Violet.

References

External links

 

1993 films
Hong Kong drama films
Films directed by Clara Law
Films set in the 7th century
Films set in China
Films with screenplays by Lilian Lee
1990s Hong Kong films